The Zamboanga del Norte Provincial Board is the Sangguniang Panlalawigan (provincial legislature) of the Philippine province of Zamboanga del Norte.

The members are elected via plurality-at-large voting: the province is divided into three districts, the first district sending two members, and the second and third districts sending four members each to the provincial board; the number of candidates the electorate votes for and the number of winning candidates depends on the number of members their district sends. The vice governor is the ex officio presiding officer, and only votes to break ties. The vice governor is elected via the plurality voting system province-wide.

The districts used in appropriation of members is coextensive with the legislative districts of Zamboanga del Norte.

Aside from the regular members, the board also includes the provincial federation presidents of the Liga ng mga Barangay (ABC, from its old name "Association of Barangay Captains"), the Sangguniang Kabataan (SK, youth councils) and the Philippine Councilors League (PCL).

Apportionment

List of members

Current members 
These are the members after the 2022 local elections and 2018 barangay and SK elections:

 Vice Governor: Julius C. Napigquit (PDP–Laban)

Officers

Past members

Vice Governors

1st District Board Members 

City: Dapitan
Municipalities: La Libertad, Mutia, Piñan, Polanco, Rizal, Sergio Osmeña Sr., Sibutad
Population (2015): 224,893

2nd District Board Members 

City: Dipolog
Municipalities: Jose Dalman, Katipunan, Manukan, President Manuel A. Roxas, Siayan, Sindangan
Population (2015):  413,974

3rd District 

Municipalities: Baliguian, Godod, Gutalac, Kalawit, Labason, Leon B. Postigo, Liloy, Salug, Sibuco, Siocon, Sirawai, Tampilisan
Population (2015): 372,526

Philippine Councilors League President 
These are members representing a group of elected councilors from the two City Councils (Dapitan and Dipolog) and twenty-five Municipal Councils of Zamboanga del Norte.

Liga ng mga Barangay President 
These are members representing a group of elected Barangay captains from the 27 ABC councils of Zamboanga del Norte.

Sangguniang Kabataan Federation President 
These are members representing a group of elected SK chairpersons from 27 SK Federation councils of Zamboanga del Norte.

Notes

References

See also
2019 Zamboanga del Norte local elections

Zamboanga del Norte
Politics of Zamboanga del Norte
Provincial boards in the Philippines